Nicolletia, common name hole-in-the-sand plant, is a small genus of flowering plants in tribe Tageteae within the family Asteraceae.

The genus is named for explorer Jean Nicholas Nicollet, 1786–1843.

 Species
 Nicolletia edwardsii A.Gray - western Texas, Chihuahua, Coahuila, Durango, Zacatecas
 Nicolletia occidentalis A.Gray - Mojave hole-in-the-sand plant - Baja California, southern California
 Nicolletia trifida Rydb. - Baja California, Baja California Sur

References

Tageteae
Asteraceae genera
Flora of Mexico
Flora of the Western United States
Taxa named by Asa Gray